Niže nego ljudski (Less Than Human) is the second studio album by the Serbian alternative rock band Supernaut, released by Zvono Records in 1998. This was the first studio album to feature bassist Saša Radić, and featured the band first hit song "Tata Roll". The cover for the album, available only on compact cassette, was designed by Srđan Marković "Đile". In 2009, bassist Radić announced that the band was looking for the original tapes of the band first releases, including Niže nego ljudski, in order to rerelease them on CD.

Track listing

Personnel
 Srđan Marković "Đile" (vocals, guitar)
 Saša Radić (bass guitar)
 Svetolik Trifunović "Trile" (rhythm machine)

References

External links and other sources
 EX YU ROCK enciklopedija 1960-2006, Janjatović Petar; 
 Niže nego ljudski at Discogs
 Niže nego ljudski at Rateyourmusic

Supernaut (Serbian band) albums
1998 albums
Serbian-language albums